Konstantinos "Kostas" Papanikolaou (born 31 July 1990) is a Greek professional basketball player and the team captain for Olympiacos of the Greek Basket League and the EuroLeague. Standing at 2.04 m (6'8 ") tall, he plays at the small forward position. He has previously played in the NBA for the Houston Rockets and the Denver Nuggets, as well as for the EuroLeague powerhouse FC Barcelona. Papanikolaou is also a regular member of the senior Hellenic national team. He is widely considered amongst the best defensive players in European basketball.

Professional career

Aris (2008–2009)
Papanikolaou began playing basketball with the youth teams of Proteas Grevenon and Aris, and he made his pro debut in the Greek League, with Aris, during the 2008–09 season. He was named the MVP of the Greek Youth All-Star Game in 2009. He was also named the Greek League's Best Young Player in 2009.

Olympiacos (2009–2013)
On 14 September 2009, Papanikolaou signed a five-year, €1.3 million net income deal with Olympiacos, after Olympiacos paid a €950,000 buyout fee to Aris, to secure his player rights. Papanikolaou's contract with Olympiacos had an NBA buyout clause worth €1 million.

With Olympiacos, he won the EuroLeague and Greek League championships in 2012. Papanikolaou was voted the EuroLeague Rising Star for the EuroLeague 2012–13 season. With Olympiacos, he also won the 2012–13 season EuroLeague championship.

FC Barcelona (2013–2014)
On 20 July 2013, Papanikolaou signed a four-year deal with Spanish League club FC Barcelona, after Barcelona bought Papanikolaou out of his contract with Olympiacos, paying a transfer buyout fee of €1.5 million to Olympiacos, and giving Papanikolaou a contract worth €5.5 million net income, during the contract's first three years (the 4th optional year would be at an additional salary). The contract included NBA buyout clauses in the amounts of €1.1 million for 2014, and €750,000 for 2015.

Barcelona went on to win the 2013–14 Spanish Liga ACB championship.

Houston Rockets (2014–2015)
On 28 June 2012, Papanikolaou was selected with the 48th overall pick in the 2012 NBA draft by the New York Knicks. On July 16, 2012, his draft rights were acquired by the Portland Trail Blazers, via a trade that sent Raymond Felton to the Knicks.

On 10 July 2013, Papanikolaou's rights were acquired by the Houston Rockets, via a trade that sent Thomas Robinson to the Trail Blazers.

On 23 September 2014, Papanikolaou signed with the Houston Rockets. On 13 February 2015, he took part in the Rising Stars Challenge of the NBA All-Star Game; in spite of an injury-plagued rookie season, during which he averaged 4.2 points and 2.7 rebounds per game, while coming off the bench, the Rockets decided to pick up his team option for the 2015–16 season.

Denver Nuggets (2015–2016)
On 20 July 2015, the Rockets traded Papanikolaou, Joey Dorsey, Nick Johnson, Pablo Prigioni, a 2016 first-round draft pick, and cash considerations to the Denver Nuggets, in exchange for Ty Lawson and a 2017 second-round draft pick. On 25 September 2015, he was waived by the Nuggets. He later re-signed with Denver on November 5, 2015, and made his debut for the team that night. He was waived again by the Nuggets on 7 January 2016, before his salary became fully guaranteed.

Return to the Olympiacos (2016–present)
On 20 January 2016, Papanikolaou signed a two-and-a-half-year deal with Olympiacos, returning to the club for a second stint. On 5 July 2018, Papanikolaou and Olympiacos officially agreed on a new three-year contract extension. He signed another three-year extension on 22 September 2020.

National team career

Greek junior national
As a member of the junior national basketball teams of Greece, Papanikolaou won the silver medal at the 2007 FIBA Europe Under-18 Championship and the gold medal at the 2008 FIBA Europe Under-18 Championship. He also won the silver medal at the 2009 FIBA Under-19 World Cup. Papanikolaou also won the gold medal at the 2009 FIBA Europe Under-20 Championship, where he was also named to the All-Tournament Team and won the MVP award. He then won the silver medal at the 2010 FIBA Europe Under-20 Championship with Greece's junior national team, where he was also named to the All-Tournament Team.

Greek senior national team
In August 2009, Papanikolaou made his debut with the senior men's Greek national basketball team, in a friendly game.  With Greece's senior national team, he then played at EuroBasket 2011, the 2012 FIBA World Olympic Qualifying Tournament, the EuroBasket 2013, the 2014 FIBA World Cup, the EuroBasket 2015, and the EuroBasket 2017. He also played at the 2019 FIBA World Cup qualification.
He has appeared in 134 games for the senior national side and has scored a total of 842 points.

Player profile
A player who with his energy and athletic ability fills every corner of the parquet. He is a modern guard-forward with the ability to fight at least three positions (2-3-4) with great success. Is good 3 points shooter and he loves to run in surprise and often finish the stages with striking nails. It has a prestigious winning mindset and thanks to this it has already celebrated many national and collective titles. Excellent defender,  to his long legs and elusive abilities, while helping him play left-handed.

Awards and accomplishments

Youth club career
Aris Thessaloniki
Panhellenic Youth Championship Champion: (2009)

Club career 

Olympiacos
2× EuroLeague Champion: (2012, 2013)
3× Greek League Champion: (2012, 2016, 2022)
3× Greek Cup Winner: (2010, 2011, 2022)
 Greek Super Cup Winner: (2022)

Barcelona
Spanish League Champion: (2014)

Greek junior national team
2007 FIBA Europe Under-18 Championship: 
2008 Albert Schweitzer Tournament: 
2008 FIBA Europe Under-18 Championship: 
2009 FIBA Under-19 World Cup: 
2010 FIBA Europe Under-20 Championship:

Individual

Pro clubs
Olympiacos 2010–20 Team of Decade
EuroLeague Rising Star: (2013)
EuroLeague Finals Top Scorer: (2012)
 2× EuroLeague MVP of the Round
 EuroLeague  three-point field goal percentage leader (2013)
Eurohoops.com's EuroLeague Best Defender: (2018)
4× Included among the Best Defenders of the Euroleague: (2017, 2018, 2019, 2022)
 Brainbasketball.com's  All-Euroleague Defensive Team: (2020)
3× All-Greek League Team: (2012, 2013, 2017)
3× All-Greek League Defensive Team: (2012 2013, 2017)
4× Greek League All-Star: (2013, 2018, 2019, 2022)
2× Greek League Best Young Player: (2009, 2012)
 Eurobasket.com's All-Greek League Player of the Year (2012)
Greek Youth All-Star Game MVP: (2009)
Panhellenic Youth Championship MVP: (2009)

Greek Youth national team
2009 FIBA Europe Under-20 Championship MVP
2009 FIBA Europe Under-20 Championship All-Tournament Team
2010 FIBA Europe Under-20 Championship All-Tournament Team

EuroLeague records
First Player in EuroLeague History with: 
+2.000 Points, +1.000 Rebounds, +400 Assists, +300 3 PM, +200 Steals, +100 Blocks
Olympiacos EuroLeague all-time leader in steals

Career statistics

NBA

Regular season

|-
| style="text-align:left;"| 
| style="text-align:left;"| Houston
| 43 || 1 || 18.5 || .350 || .292 || .722 || 2.7 || 2.0 || .7 || .3 || 4.2
|-
| style="text-align:left;"| 
| style="text-align:left;"| Denver
| 26 || 6 || 11.3 || .364 || .313 || .643 || 1.5 || .6 || .5 || .2 || 2.6
|- class="sortbottom"
| style="text-align:left;"| Career
| style="text-align:left;"|
| 69 || 7 || 15.8 || .354 || .297 || .688 || 2.3 || 1.5 || .6 || .3 || 3.6
|}

Playoffs

|-
| style="text-align:left;"| 2015
| style="text-align:left;"| Houston
| 8 || 0 || 2.6 || .250 || .000 || .500 || .3 || .0 || .0 || .0 || .4
|- class="sortbottom"
| style="text-align:left;"| Career
| style="text-align:left;"|
| 8 || 0 || 2.6 || .250 || .000 || .500 || .3 || .0 || .0 || .0 || .4

EuroLeague

|-
| style="text-align:left;"| 2009–10
| style="text-align:left;" rowspan=4| Olympiacos
| 6 || 1 || 6.4 || .250 || .000 || .500 || 1.2 || .8 || .5 || .0 || .8 || 2.0
|-
| style="text-align:left;"| 2010–11
| 16 || 14 || 13.7 || .447 || .435 || .647 || 3.1 || .3 || .6 || .1 || 3.9 || 4.6
|-
| style="text-align:left;background:#AFE6BA;"| 2011–12†
| 22 || 13 || 19.8 || .490 || .333 || .688 || 3.4 || .6 || .5 || .3 || 6.1 || 7.4
|-
| style="text-align:left;background:#AFE6BA;"| 2012–13†
| 31 || 30 || 23.8 || .497 || style="background:#CFECEC;"|.521 || .723 || 4.4 || 1.4 || .9 || .7 || 8.7 || 11.7
|-
| style="text-align:left;"| 2013–14
| style="text-align:left;"| Barcelona
| 28 || 27 || 25.0 || .507 || .361 || .500 || 3.4 || 2.2 || .8 || .5 || 6.9 || 8.5
|-
| style="text-align:left;"| 2015–16
| style="text-align:left;" rowspan=7|Olympiacos
| 7 || 5 || 18.9 || .410 || .118 || .583 || 4.3 || 1.0 || .6 || .4 || 5.9 || 5.9
|-
| style="text-align:left;"| 2016–17
| 37 || 32 || 23.2 || .422 || .316 || .826 || 4.8 || 1.5 || 1.2 || .4 || 8.1 || 9.7
|-
| style="text-align:left;"| 2017–18
| 28 || 23 || 24.1 || .469 || .373 || .775 || 4.3 || 2.1 || 1.0 || .4 || 8.3 || 11.3
|-
| style="text-align:left;"| 2018–19
| 30 || 23 || 23.2 || .545|| .371 || .738 || 3.9 || 1.6  || 0.8  || 9 || 6.9 || 8.1
|-
| style="text-align:left;"| 2019–20
| 26 || 21 || 23.5  || .606|| .391 || .708 || 3.6 || 1.5  || 1.4  || 8 || 8.5 || 9.4
|-
| style="text-align:left;"| 2020–21
| 14 || 13 || 21.4  || 353|| .370 || .895 || 2.2 || 1.9  || 0.6  || 7 || 5.7 || 5.9
|-
| style="text-align:left;"| 2021–22
| 37 || 37 || 23.2  || 556|| .311 || .758 || 2.5 || 1.6  || 0.9  || 8 || 6.6 || 6.6
|- class="sortbottom"
| style="text-align:left;"| Career
| style="text-align:left;"|
| 231 || 212 || 21.5 || .550 || .372 || .723 || 3.9 || .14 || 0.8 || 9 || 7.2 || 8.9

References

External links

Kostas Papanikolaou at acb.com 
Kostas Papanikolaou at draftexpress.com
Kostas Papanikolaou at esake.gr 
Kostas Papanikolaou at eurobasket.com
Kostas Papanikolaou at euroleague.net
Kostas Papanikolaou at FIBA.com

1990 births
Living people
2014 FIBA Basketball World Cup players
2019 FIBA Basketball World Cup players
Aris B.C. players
Denver Nuggets players
FC Barcelona Bàsquet players
Greek Basket League players
Greek expatriate basketball people in Spain
Greek expatriate basketball people in the United States
Greek men's basketball players
Houston Rockets players
Liga ACB players
National Basketball Association players from Greece
New York Knicks draft picks
Olympiacos B.C. players
Small forwards
Basketball players from Trikala